Joseph Pannaye (29 July 1922 – 20 February 2009) was a Belgian footballer. He played in 13 matches for the Belgium national football team from 1944 to 1947.

References

External links
 

1922 births
2009 deaths
Belgian footballers
Belgium international footballers
Place of birth missing
Association footballers not categorized by position